Justyna Bojczuk (born 21 August 1995) is a Polish actress and voice actress.
She contributes to voicing characters in cartoons, anime, movies, sitcoms, and videogames.

Bojczuk is well known for providing the voice of  Isabella Garcia-Shapiro in the Polish language dub of the animated series Phineas and Ferb. She also provides the voice of the character Iris in the Polish language dub of the anime series Pokémon.

Bojczuk works at SDI Media Polska, Start International Polska, and other dubbing studios in Poland.

Filmography

Television
 Beatka in Do dzwonka
 Alicja Kramer in Warsaw Pact
 Żaneta Mikiciuk in Barwy Szczęścia
 Matilda in Violetta

Voice work

Anime and animation
 Isabella Garcia-Shapiro in Phineas and Ferb
 Isabella Garcia-Shapiro/Isabella-2 in Phineas and Ferb the Movie: Across the 2nd Dimension
 Iris and Leona in Pokémon
 Iris in Pokémon the Movie: Black—Victini and Reshiram and White—Victini and Zekrom
 Sweetie Belle in My Little Pony: Friendship Is Magic (MiniMini edition)
 Flo in Puppy in My Pocket: Adventures in Pocketville
 Toph in Avatar: The Last Airbender
 Wadi (First voice) in The Secret Saturdays
 Shelly in Sammy's Adventures: The Secret Passage
 Zoe in Animalia
 Penny in Despicable Me
 Darby in My Friends Tigger & Pooh
 Linny the Guinea Pig in Wonder Pets
 Billie in Guess with Jess
 Zephie in Chuggington
 Ivy in The Wish That Changed Christmas
 Rosie and Bridget Hatt in Thomas and Friends
 Raa Raa the Noisy Lion
 Priscilla in Rango
 Sheena in Hey Arnold! (Nickelodeon edition)
 Sam McCloud (voice) in Stoked
 Impy in Impy's Island	
 Ben and Holly’s Little Kingdom
 Peaches in Ice Age: A Mammoth Christmas
 Pepper Potts (season 2) in Iron Man: Armored Adventures'

Live-action shows and films
 Carly Shay in iCarly Zora Lancaster and Dakota in Sonny with a Chance Zora Lancaster in So Random! Talia, Lisa Cucuy, Tina, and Jackie Evancho  in Wizards of Waverly Place Katara in The Last Airbender Max and Holly O'Neil in The Suite Life of Zack & Cody Megan Parker in Drake & Josh Nim Rusoe in Nim's Island Mei Ying in The Karate Kid (2010 film) Emily in Johnny Tsunami Nikki Fletcher in Ice Princess Ginger Falcone (Second voice) in Zeke and Luther Rosebud in Space Buddies Will in The Search for Santa Paws
 Olive Doyle in A.N.T. Farm
 Sadie Jenkins in Sadie J
 Cat Valentine in Victorious and Sam & Cat

Video games
 Amata Almodovar in Fallout 3
 Pandora in God of War III

References

External links
 

Living people
Actresses from Warsaw
Polish voice actresses
1995 births